The Under Secretary for Terrorism and Financial Intelligence is a position within the United States Department of the Treasury responsible for directing the Treasury's efforts to cut the lines of financial support for terrorists, fight financial crime, enforce economic sanctions against rogue nations, and combat the financial support of the proliferation of weapons of mass destruction. The Under Secretary is appointed by the President and confirmed by the Senate.

, the Under Secretary is Brian E. Nelson, who was appointed by President Joe Biden, and confirmed to the position by the Senate on December 2, 2021.

Overview
The Under Secretary heads the Office of Terrorism and Financial Intelligence (TFI), created under 31 USC 312, when the administration of President George W. Bush announced, on May 8, 2004, that the Executive Office of Terrorist Financing and Financial Crimes (TFFC), the Financial Crimes Enforcement Network (FinCEN), the Office of Foreign Assets Control (OFAC), and allocated resources from the Treasury Department would be brought under the new office's control. The Under Secretary for Terrorism and Financial Intelligence also possesses oversight of the Office of Intelligence and Analysis, created under 31 USC 311, [one of sixteen agencies in the United States Intelligence Community per 50 USC 3003]. The Federal Reserve remains outside the jurisdiction of this office, and cannot be investigated by it.

History
The position's predecessor, the Under Secretary for Enforcement, managed law enforcement aspects of the Department prior to the reorganization. The Under Secretary for Enforcement provided oversight and policy guidance for the Bureau of Alcohol, Tobacco and Firearms, the U.S. Customs Service, the Federal Law Enforcement Training Center; the Financial Crimes Enforcement Network, the U.S. Secret Service, the Executive Office for Asset Forfeiture, and the Office of Foreign Assets Control. The Under Secretary also provided policy guidance over the Internal Revenue Service's Criminal Investigation Division.

Several of these agencies are now non-existent or have been moved into other federal departments. The Bureau of Alcohol, Tobacco, and Firearms was split into two separate bureaus, with one handling certain law enforcement aspects and the other handling tax collection aspects. The former was moved into the United States Department of Justice, while the latter was kept within the Department of the Treasury. The U.S. Secret Service and the Federal Law Enforcement Training Center are now within the Department of Homeland Security. The U.S. Customs Service was moved into the Department of Homeland Security when it became part of the U.S. Customs and Border Protection. However, under the Homeland Security Act of 2002 Custom Service's "revenue functions" were retained by Treasury. This includes, among others, Customs duties, enforcing trade agreements, and counterfeit trademark detection and seizure.

Former Under Secretaries
Former Under Secretaries include Jimmy Gurule, James Johnson, Raymond Kelly, Ronald Noble, Stuart A. Levey, and David Cohen. Adam Szubin was appointed Under Secretary under the Obama administration but was never confirmed by the Senate.

See also
Financial Transactions and Reports Analysis Centre of Canada

References

 
Financial crime prevention
Counterterrorism